Hoburgen is a rauk (sea stack) area on the Storsudret peninsula in Sundre  socken on the southern tip of Gotland, Sweden.

The area contains one of Gotland's most noted rauks, the Hoburgsgubben ("Old Man Hoburg"). One of the asteroids in the asteroid belt, 10104 Hoburgsgubben, is named after it. South of Hoburgen is the Hoburg Shoal bird reserve.

Hoburgen is also one of the permanent weather stations along the Swedish coast. It is reported from daily in the Swedish Shipping Forecast.

Climate 
Hoburgen has a maritime climate with less differences between summer and winter than mainland Sweden. The very same effect ensures that Hoburgen rarely if ever gets cold winters by typical Swedish standards. Another effect is the seasonal lag causing August to surpass July on many years in terms of being the warmest month and February typically being the coldest.

References 

Gotland
Landforms of Gotland County
Peninsulas of Sweden